The Hongguangzhen railway station is a railway station of Chengdu–Dujiangyan Intercity Railway. The station located in Pidu District, Chengdu, Sichuan, China.

Destinations
Trains depart this station bound for:
 Chengdu
 Xipu
 Pixian West
 Dujiangyan
 Qingchengshan
 Yingbin Road
 Lidui Park

Rolling stock
China Railways CRH1A

See also
Chengdu–Dujiangyan Intercity Railway

Stations on the Chengdu–Dujiangyan Intercity Railway
Railway stations in Sichuan
Railway stations in China opened in 2010